1964 is a documentary film produced by Insignia Films for the American Experience series about political, social and cultural events in the United States for the calendar year 1964. It is based partly on Jon Margolis' book The Last Innocent Year: America in 1964. The documentary depicts the year 1964 as significant and epic in that following the assassination of President John F. Kennedy in late 1963, 1964, as a presidential election year, becomes a departure point for American history, with lasting effects today. It is also the year of the British Invasion led by the Beatles, when Cassius Clay fights Sonny Liston for the World Heavyweight Championship, the year after Betty Friedan's book, The Feminine Mystique, is published, and the year Republican activist, Phyllis Schlafly's book, A Choice, Not an Echo, is published. It is also the year of Freedom Summer, an initiative by the Student Nonviolent Coordinating Committee to register African-Americans in Mississippi, the subsequent murders of Chaney, Goodman, and Schwerner, three CORE activists, in Mississippi by white supremacists that created a national sensation, and the Harlem riot of 1964, culminating in the Berkeley Free Speech Movement at the University of California at Berkeley. A recurrent theme of the film is its departure as a presidential election year, with President Lyndon B. Johnson running as the expected Democratic Party nominee and the nomination of U.S. Senator Barry Goldwater selected through a grassroots campaign for the Republican nomination for President of the United States, that defines the future divisions of the US political party competition.

The 1964 interviews were conducted in 2014 and made accessible online in the American Archive of Public Broadcasting in 2018.

Commentators
 Mark Kurlansky – writer
 Lee Edwards – historian – part of 1964 Goldwater Campaign
 Jon Margolis – author of The Last Innocent Year: America in 1964
 Leah Wright Rigueur – historian 
 Rick Perlstein - writer
 Hodding Carter III – newspaper editor of family newspaper, The Delta-Democrat Times of Greenville, Mississippi
 Robert A. Caro – author
 Robert Dallek – historian 
 Dan T. Carter - historian
 Claire Bond Potter – historian 
 Stephanie Coontz – historian 
 Susan J. Douglas – historian 
 Richard A. Viguerie - conservative political activist 
 Phyllis Schafly – President of Illinois Federation of Republican Women, an office she has held since 1960
 John H. Bracey, Jr. – historian
 Jann S. Wenner – founder of Rolling Stone magazine
Reverend Ed King – civil rights activist
 Dave Dennis – civil rights activist (close friends with James Baldwin's brother)

References

External links
 
 

2015 American television episodes
American Experience
PBS original programming
2015 television films
2015 films